The NBR Class D (later LNER Class J34) was a class of 0-6-0 steam locomotive of the North British Railway, often known as the Wee Drummonds. The class was designed by Dugald Drummond (Locomotive Superintendent). A total of 101 were produced.

The NBR Class D (later LNER Class J33) was an almost identical type of 0-6-0 locomotive. The design remained that of Dugald Drummond, but was slightly adapted by his successor Matthew Holmes. The changes were largely technical, whilst both classes of locomotive were virtually identical in outward appearance. A total of 36 were produced.

The class D engines (of both the Drummond and Holmes types) were highly successful in operation, and had lengthy careers in service.

Build dates
The initial class D machines (later J34) were built in batches; the first batch by Dübs and Company of Glasgow, and the subsequent batches by the North British Railway at their Cowlairs railway works. The engines were built between 1879 and 1883. All the engines were rebuilt during the years 1892 to 1908. It has been suggested that Drummond's design for these, and other 0-6-0 engines, was influenced by his admiration for locomotive designer William Stroudley.

The later class D locomotives (subsequently J33) were built in five batches between 1883 and 1887.

Thus the North British Railway operated a total of 137 class D locomotives, 101 of the J34 type, and 36 of the J33 type.

History
Although both engine types were included in the class D designation when the NBR adopted formal class designations in 1913, in 1923 (on grouping) the LNER considered the locomotives to be sufficiently different mechanically to warrant different class designations. Thus the original Drummond D class became LNER class J34, whilst the modified Holmes D class became LNER class J33. There are documented examples of even the NBR's own locomotive workshops failing to correctly distinguish between the J33 and J34 types of D class engine, owing to their near-identical appearance.

Class D (J34)
The Class D (J34) engines were designed to meet a perceived need for a smaller version of the already highly successful Drummond class C (later J32) 0-6-0 freight engines. The problem with the class C engines was their size and weight, which made them unsuitable for certain routes. Drummond produced the class D on similar principles, but with a significant reduction in overall length and weight of the engine, thus permitting far wider route access for freight train operation. It was this history which led to the popular nickname "Wee Drummonds" for members of the class.

The engines worked well, and although designed for light freight, were regularly employed on mainline passenger services, or wherever required on the network. They were versatile and flexible, owing to their size and weight. This ease of use led to almost all the engines surviving into LNER ownership. However, the LNER set about retiring the class almost at once, and the last two were withdrawn for scrap in January 1928.

Class D (J33)
The class D (J33) engines were simply a continuation of the earlier Drummond D class engines, in which Holmes removed the toolbox from the rear of the tender, and designed a different (and non-sloping) fire grate. The Drummond D class engines were also changed to this type of fire grate when they were rebuilt. Owing to the close similarity, they were often identified colloquially as "Wee Drummonds", although the nickname properly belongs only to the J34 type. At a late stage in construction Holmes designed a new cab for the D class engines, although the bulk of the modified class D machines (J33) had already been built with Drummond cabs, just like the original class D engines (J34). Thus the machines with the Holmes style cabs simply became an interesting variation within the class. It is suggested (for example, by NBR historian John Thomas) that the drivers found the Holmes cabs more pleasant to work in, and less draughty.

Like the original D class engines, the modified D class saw widespread service, not only on their intended work (light freight), but also on suburban passenger services, and sometimes even long-distance coal trains. The later members of the class were actually fitted with the Westinghouse brake apparatus from new, an indication of the intention to employ them on passenger services. Under the LNER they were gradually relegated to secondary roles such as station pilot or shunter. They were withdrawn between 1924 and 1932 with the exception of two engines (9159 and 9249) which survived considerably longer, both being withdrawn for scrap in 1938.

Accidents
On 28 November 1890 two class D locomotives were involved in a serious head-on collision on Todd's Mill Viaduct. The engines involved were numbers 501 and 524, the latter actually crashing off the viaduct, resulting in a fall of around 60 feet.

Preservation
The last class D (J34) was scrapped in 1928. No examples of this class were preserved.

The last class D (J33) was scrapped in 1938. No examples of this class were preserved.

Sources
 Ian Allan ABC of British Railways Locomotives, 1948 edition, part 4.

References

D
0-6-0 locomotives
Railway locomotives introduced in 1879
Railway locomotives introduced in 1883
Standard gauge steam locomotives of Great Britain
Scrapped locomotives
Freight locomotives